Rowohlt may refer to:

 Rowohlt Verlag, a publishing house
 Ernst Rowohlt, publisher
 Harry Rowohlt, writer
 Maria Rowohlt, actress

German-language surnames